Port Kavkaz is a small harbour on the Kerch Strait in Krasnodar Krai, Russia.

It was the eastern terminal of the railroad and car Kerch Strait ferry line connecting Krasnodar Krai with Crimea (the western terminal of the ferry line is Port Krym).

In August 2014 Russian Prime Minister Dmitry Medvedev signed a government order to enlarge the area of the port near Crimea with the aim to increase cargo transportation volumes with the use of large ships. The borders of the port were changed to add a deep-water area south of the port of Taman for large vessels to anchor. Plans included an additional 15–18 anchor places for loading large ships.

References

Ports and harbours of Russia
Geography of Krasnodar Krai
Kerch Strait